William Squires (born 20 March 1796) was an English cricketer who was recorded in one first-class match in 1826 when he played for a combined Sheffield and Leicester team, scoring 0 runs in his only innings and holding no catches. Squires played for Leicester Cricket Club from 1823 to 1839.

References

1796 births
English cricketers
English cricketers of 1826 to 1863
Leicestershire cricketers
Year of death unknown
People from the Borough of Charnwood
Cricketers from Leicestershire